Arran James Pettifer (born 1 October 2003) is an English footballer who plays as a midfielder for Atherton Collieries on loan from League One side Bolton Wanderers.

Career
Pettifer came through the Bolton Wanderers Reserves Academy, which he joined at the age of seven.

Pettifer made his Bolton debut on 5 October 2021 in a 4–1 victory against Liverpool U21's in the EFL Trophy, coming on in the 72nd minute as a substitute for Josh Sheehan. On 30 November 2021, he made his first appearance against a professional team in a 1–0 victory against Fleetwood Town, also in the EFL Trophy, coming on in the 70th minute as a substitute for the game's goalscorer Kieran Lee.

On 13 June 2022, Pettifer became one of the five Academy graduates that signed their first professional contracts with Bolton.

On 26 August 2022, Pettifer joined Northern Premier League Premier Division club Atherton Collieries on a short-term loan deal alongside teammate Finlay Lockett. The loan was later extended until January 2023 and then February.

Career statistics

Notes

References

2003 births
Living people
Footballers from Stockport
Association football midfielders
English footballers
Bolton Wanderers F.C. players
Atherton Collieries A.F.C. players